Keith House may refer to:

Buildings
 Agnes Keith House, Sandakan, Sabah, Malaysia

United States 
(by state)
Keith House (Little Rock, Arkansas), listed on the National Register of Historic Places (NRHP)
Keith Cabin, Pittman, Florida, NRHP-listed
Edson Keith Estate, Sarasota, Florida, NRHP-listed
Wells-Keith House, Augusta, Kentucky, listed on the NRHP in Bracken County, Kentucky
Reverend James Keith Parsonage, also known as Keith House, a 17th-century building in West Bridgewater, Massachusetts
Charles S. Keith House, Kansas City, Missouri, NRHP-listed
David Keith House, Kirkwood, Missouri, listed on the NRHP in St. Louis County, Missouri
Harry C. Keith House, Kalispell, Montana, listed on the NRHP in Flathead County, Montana
John M. Keith House, Missoula, Montana, listed on the NRHP in Missoula County, Montana
Clark-Keith House, Caledonia, New York, NRHP-listed
Keith House (Upper Makefield Township, Pennsylvania), NRHP-listed
Alexander H. Keith House, Athens, Tennessee, NRHP-listed
Keith House (Austin, Texas), NRHP-listed
David Keith Mansion and Carriage House, Salt Lake City, Utah, NRHP-listed

People
 Keith E. House (1926–2005), American music educator